The  Atlanta Falcons season was the franchise's 48th season in the National Football League and the sixth under head coach Mike Smith. The Falcons entered the season as one of the Super Bowl favorites; However, due to multiple key injuries to the team, the Falcons failed to improve on their 13–3 season from 2012, after a 23–30 loss to the New England Patriots in week 4 and failed to match their 13–3 record from last year as a result of a 28–30 week 5 loss against the New York Jets. They were mathematically eliminated from postseason contention for the first time since 2009 and secured the Falcons’ first losing season since 2007, after a 13–17 week 12 loss to the New Orleans Saints.

2013 draft class

Notes
 The Falcons traded their first- (No. 30 overall), third (No. 92 overall) and sixth- (No. 198 overall) round selections to the St. Louis Rams in exchange for the Rams' 2013 first-round selection (No. 22 overall) and a 2015 seventh-round selection.
 Compensatory selection.
 The Falcons traded their fifth- (No. 163 overall) and original seventh- (No. 236 overall) round selections to the Chicago Bears in exchange for the Bears' fifth-round selection (No. 153 overall).

Staff

Final roster

Depth chart

Schedule

Preseason

Regular season

Note: Intra-division opponents are in bold text.
 #  Indicates that the Falcons were the visiting team in the Bills Toronto Series.

Game summaries

Week 1: at New Orleans Saints

The Falcons would travel to New Orleans to open their season. The Falcons would carry a 17-13 lead into the fourth quarter, but the Saints would score a touchdown with 6:22 remaining. The Falcons would try to rally, but the comeback fell short, as the Saints would add a field goal to win 23-17. With the loss, the Falcons started their season 0-1 for the second time in 3 seasons.

Week 2: vs. St. Louis Rams

The Falcons would return to Atlanta for their home opener against the Rams. The Falcons would have a big first half, cruising to a 24-3 lead at halftime. St. Louis would try to come back, and outscored Atlanta 21-7 in the second half, but it was not enough as the Falcons held on for the win. With the win, the Falcons evened their record at 1-1.

Week 3: at Miami Dolphins

The Falcons would lead the entire game until the Dolphins went down to score the game-winning touchdown with 38 seconds remaining. The Falcons would try to go down to the end zone to pull out the win, but they would not, and the Falcons would lose 27-23 to the Miami Dolphins. With the loss, the Falcons fell to 1-2.

Week 4: vs. New England Patriots

The Falcons would go back home for a Sunday Night Football game against the New England Patriots. The Falcons would put up a good fight, but they would lose a close shootout against the undefeated Patriots. With the loss, the Falcons fell to 1-3.

Week 5: vs. New York Jets

The Falcons would go down the field to score with 1:54 remaining on a Matt Bryant field goal. However, the Jets would go down and kick a field goal as time expired to give the Jets the win. With the loss, the Falcons fell to 1-4 for the first time since 2007.

Week 7: vs. Tampa Bay Buccaneers

The Falcons would stay home for a divisional game against winless Tampa Bay. The Falcons would never trail during the game, and they would win this game 31-23. The Falcons cruised to a 24-10 lead at halftime, and held off a second half Tampa Bay rally for the victory.

With the win, the Falcons improved to 2-4 while sending Tampa Bay to 0-7.

Week 8: at Arizona Cardinals

The Falcons would travel to Arizona to take on the Cardinals. The Falcons would struggle all game, committing 4 turnovers (all interceptions by Matt Ryan) as they lost 27-13. With the loss, the Falcons fell to 2-5.

Week 9: at Carolina Panthers

The Falcons would go to Carolina for a showdown with the Panthers. The Falcons would once again struggle as they would commit 4 turnovers for the second straight week as they lost 34-10 to Carolina. With the loss, the Falcons fell to 2-6.

Week 10: vs. Seattle Seahawks

In a rematch of last seasons divisional game, the Falcons went down easily this time to Seattle, losing 33-10. With the loss, the Falcons fell to 2-7.

Week 11: at Tampa Bay Buccaneers

The Falcons traveled to Tampa Bay for game 2 against the Bucs. The Falcons would suffer a mountain of embarrassment, as they lost 41-28 to the one-win Buccaneers. It was the most points the Buccaneers had scored in a single game all season, and the most points the Falcons had surrendered in a single game all season.

With the loss, the Falcons fell to 2-8.

Week 12: vs. New Orleans Saints

With the loss, coupled with wins by the Cardinals, 49ers and the Panthers, the Falcons were the first team this season to be eliminated from playoff contention.

Week 13: at Buffalo Bills
Bills Toronto Series

In this game, the Falcons would travel to Toronto for their game against the Bills, as it was the Bills Toronto game for the 2013 season. The Bills would lead 31-24 during the 4th quarter, but the Falcons would go down and score the game-tying touchdown with 1:28 remaining in regulation. In overtime, the Falcons would win on a Matt Bryant field goal to give the Falcons the win. With the win, the Falcons would end their 5-game losing streak and improve to 3-9.

Week 14: at Green Bay Packers

The Falcons would travel to Green Bay for a game against the Packers. The Falcons had a lot of chances to try and get the lead in the fourth quarter, but the Packers would ultimately hold a 22-21 lead for the final 12:01 as the Falcons failed to score in the fourth quarter. With the loss, the Falcons fell to 3-10.

Week 15: vs. Washington Redskins

The Falcons would go home for a battle against 3-10 Washington. The Falcons would win the game 27-26. The Redskins would go down to score with 18 seconds remaining, but mainly since they were 3-10, they tried to go for 2 and give them the lead and ultimately the win. However, the attempt was no good and the Falcons held on. With the win, the Falcons improved to 4-10.

Week 16: at San Francisco 49ers

The Falcons would travel to San Francisco for a Monday Night game against the 49ers. The Falcons had a shot at getting the lead in the 4th quarter, but NaVorro Bowman would return an interception 89 yards for a touchdown to put the game away. With the loss, the Falcons fell to 4-11. The loss also allowed the 49ers to clinch a playoff berth.

Week 17: vs. Carolina Panthers

With the loss, the Falcons finished their season 4-12 being swept by the Panthers for the first time since 1997.

Standings

Division

Conference

References

External links
 

Atlanta
Atlanta Falcons seasons
2013 in sports in Georgia (U.S. state)